IBM was a 2009 project using the resources developed in 2007's IBM/Google Cloud Computing partnership. This initiative was to provide access to cloud computing for the universities of all countries.

This initiative was funded by the National Science Foundation awarding $5 million in grants to 14 universities, including Kyushu University, University of Washington, Carnegie Mellon University, and Massachusetts Institute of Technology. The goal of this initiative was to enhance university curricula in parallel programming techniques and to promote cloud computing research and development.

With funding help from the U.S. National Science Foundation, the cloud computing initiative provided assistance to hundreds of university scientists working on research projects.

By 2011, Google and IBM were completing the program since high-performance cloud computing clusters had become widely available to researchers at reasonable costs.

References

Further reading

Cloud platforms
Google
IBM cloud services